Denali Foxx (or simply Denali) is the stage name of Cordero Matthew Zuckerman (born April 1, 1992),
an American drag performer, figure skater, and choreographer most known for competing on the thirteenth season of RuPaul's Drag Race.

Early life
Born to Jeffrey Alan Zuckerman and Jo Ann Hernandez on April 1, 1992, in Fairbanks, Alaska, Zuckerman was raised by parents of Mexican descent. Zuckerman graduated from University of Utah in 2013 with a Bachelor of Arts degree in Spanish Language and Literature and minor in comparative literature and Korean.

Career
Zuckerman is a double gold medalist in the U.S. Figure Skating moves and freestyle category and a PSA certified coach. He has skated with Cirque du Soleil, SeaWorld, and Royal Caribbean Productions and choreographed for Team USA figure skaters Mariah Bell, Amber Glenn, and Ashley Cain-Gribble / Timothy LeDuc.

Denali competed on the thirteenth season of RuPaul's Drag Race. She was the first contestant from Alaska and the first to compete with ice skates. During the show, she eliminated Kahmora Hall from the competition by lip syncing to "100% Pure Love" by Crystal Waters, portrayed a Russian bot in "Social Media: The Unverified Rusical", and impersonated Jonathan Van Ness during Snatch Game. She was eliminated in the season's makeover challenge after a lip sync against Olivia Lux, finishing in 8th place.

Personal life
Zuckerman lives in Chicago, as of 2021. He has a third-degree black belt in martial arts.

In 2017, Zuckerman was arrested for public intoxication and possessing a controlled substance while performing with Cirque du Soleil.

Discography

Filmography

Television

Web series

Music videos

Awards and nominations

References

External links

 Cordero Zuckerman at IMDb

1992 births
Living people
American drag queens
American figure skaters
American people of Mexican descent
Entertainers from Alaska
People from Chicago
RuPaul's Drag Race contestants
University of Utah alumni
People from Fairbanks, Alaska
Sportspeople from Fairbanks, Alaska